Shankheshwar is a town in the Patan district of Gujarat state of India. It is an important place of pilgrimage for the followers of Jainism.

History
The village is considered a place of great antiquity. Jain Acharya Merutunga had mentioned this place as Shankhpur in his works. A Paliya in the north of village had date of Samvat 1322 (1265 AD). The current temple of Parshwanath was built in 1811. There are ruins of old Jain temple in the town which is dated Samvat 1652 (1596 AD). There is a Chhatra and a memorial inscription dedicated to Shripujya, a high priest near it.

According to Mughal history, the Shankheshwar village was a lease-grant by Emperor Shah Jahan to Shantidas Jhaveri, a former nagarsheth (equivalent to mayor) of Ahmedabad.

Shankheshwar Jain Temple

In ancient inscriptions, this Jain tirth is referred to as Shankhapur. It is said that a Shravaka by the name of Ashadhi was gripped by doubts and miseries about his existence in the material world, asking "When shall I attain nirvana? When shall I be free from the bondage of the material world? When shall I be liberated?" Answering all these questions, Damodar Swami, the ninth Jain Tirthankara, said: "Parshvanath will be the twenty-third Jain Tirthankara in the avasarpini kaal, i.e. the descending half of the wheel of time. You will be his Ganadhar (prime disciple) named Aryaghosha and attain salvation there." Ashadhi then became fully engrossed in his devotion to Parshwanath.A formal History of the precursor to this tirth was written by Jain monk and eminent scholar Hemachandra Suri in the reign of Solanki king Siddharaj Jayasinh of Anhilwara (Patan).

The following is a history of the various renovations of the main temple: 
 In the year 1155 of the Vikram era (1099 CE), Sajjan Shah built the Shankheshwar temple on the banks of the Rupen river.
 In the year 1286 of the Vikram era (1230 CE), Vastupala and Tejpal renovated this temple under the guidance of Jain Acharya Vardhamansuri.
 There were 52 deities in the temple. In the year 1302 (1246 CE), the reigning King was awestruck by the incomparable grandeur of the presiding deity and inspired by Jain Acharya Uktasuri, he renovated this temple.
 In the fourteenth century of the Vikram era, the temple was destroyed by Muslim invaders.
 In the sixteenth century of the Vikram era, under the inspiration of Jain Acharya Vijaysensurisvarji, a splendid new temple was built with 52 deities.
 In the year 1760 of the Vikram era (1704 CE), the Jain Sangha built the new temple and reinstalled the presiding deity. Since then, this vast and beautiful temple has stood there in this present form.

Apart from the original sanctum-sanctorum, this temple has an open square, a decorated square, a vast square and two assembly halls. Numerous miracles are associated with this temple and the presiding deity of Lord Parshwanath, represented by a six feet high statue in the Padmasana (lotus) position.

The sanctum of the presiding deity is flanked by a smaller sanctum with Lord Bhidbhanjan Parshvanath to the right and another sanctum with the Jain Tirthankara Lord Ajitanatha to the left. The statues of Nagraj Dharanendra, Goddess Padmavatidevi, Parshva Yaksha and Goddess Chakreshvaridevi can also be found in the temple. On the tenth day of the Jain calendar month of Pausha, the tenth day of the dark half of the Jain calendar month of Margashirsha, and during the festival of Diwali, thousands of pilgrims observe a three-day fast at the temple.

Other Jain temples
Besides this temple there are several other impressive Jain temples - the Agam Mandir, the modern sprawling complex of 108 Parshvanath and Padmavati [108 Parshwanath Bhaktivihar Tirth], Shree Rajendrasuri Navkar Mandir, Kalapurnam Smriti Mandir, the Gurumandir, are important.

Shruth tirth is located two kilometer southerly to Sankeshwar on Sankheswar-Viramgam Highway.

Further four kilometer south, there is Pavapuri Jalmandir at Ratanpura. The main Pawapuri tirth, the place where Lord Mahavira  attained salvation is in the state of Bihar.

Thus Shankeshwar tirth ranks next only to those on Mount Shatrunjaya in Palitana, (Gujarat) in terms of importance to the Jaina.

Fair
A fair is held here on the full moon days of the Hindu calendar months Chaitra, corresponding to March or April, and Kartik, corresponding to October or November, and the tenth day of the second half of Maghashirsha, corresponding to December or January.

Transportation
The nearest railway stations are Harij (25]] km) and Viramgam (62 km). Bus services and private vehicles are also available. Boarding and lodging facilities are available at Jain hostels (dharam sala) in Shankheshwar. Nearest airport is Ahmedabad.

References

1.History of Shankheshwar 

2.Shankheshwar Parswanath Shankheshwara Solanki Jinalaya Bagol 

Cities and towns in Patan district